Muğla Sıtkı Koçman University was established in 1992 as a state university with four proposed faculties: the Faculty of Arts & Sciences and Humanities, the Faculty of Economics and Administrative Sciences, the Faculty of Technical Education and the Faculty of Fisheries. Mugla School of Management, founded in 1975, originally affiliated with the Ankara Academy of Economics and Administrative Sciences, was the first higher education institution in Muğla. It then became the first faculty of Muğla Sıtkı Koçman University upon its establishment. Muğla Vocational School, founded in 1989 as part of Dokuz Eylül University in Izmir, joined Muğla University.

Over the past 20 years, the university has grown to include 18  faculties, 4 graduate schools, 5 schools, 13 vocational schools, and 35 research and application centres. Today, Muğla Sıtkı Koçman University encompasses a two-million square metre campus surrounded by a spectacular mountain view and smaller university sites and schools across the province. Currently, the university services over 41,805 students and employs over 1,300 full-time academic staff.

References

External links
 Muğla University web site (pages in English)

Universities and colleges in Turkey
Muğla
State universities and colleges in Turkey
Educational institutions established in 1992
1992 establishments in Turkey
Buildings and structures in Muğla Province